George Crews McGhee (March 10, 1912 – July 4, 2005) was an oilman and a  career diplomat in the United States foreign service.

Early life
McGhee was born on March 10, 1912, in Waco, Texas, the son of a Waco banker. He studied at the University of Oklahoma, graduating with a degree in geology in 1933. He was initiated into the Oklahoma Kappa chapter of Sigma Alpha Epsilon fraternity at OU. For a time McGhee worked for Conoco, on a crew that made the first oil discovery on the Gulf Coast using reflection seismology.  He was awarded a Rhodes scholarship, and earned a doctorate in physical sciences from Oxford University in 1937. Back in the United States he became vice president  of the National Geophysical Company, where he managed reflection seismology surveys in Cuba. On his return to Texas, McGhee found employment with Everette Lee DeGolyer's oil services company DeGolyer and MacNaughton, scouting oilfields and marrying DeGolyer's daughter Cecilia. McGhee described Cecilia as "the most beautiful and richest girl in Texas." In 1940 McGhee established his own company, the McGhee Production Company, and soon discovered a major oil field at Lake Charles, Louisiana, which made his fortune.

Wartime service
At the beginning of World War II McGhee was a member of the staff of the Office of Production Management and a member of the War Production Board. Commissioned into the U.S. Navy, McGhee served as a naval air intelligence officer on the staff of Army Air Force General Curtis E. LeMay, for which he was awarded the Legion of Merit.

Diplomatic career
Following the war he was recruited to the U.S. State Department by then-Undersecretary of State William L. Clayton, joining in 1946. McGhee initially traveled on behalf of the State Department to disburse a fund of $400 million in economic and military aid to Greece and Turkey, as well as other economic aid in Africa and the Middle East. He served as U.S. Ambassador to Turkey in 1952–1953, where he supported their successful bid for NATO membership. While in Turkey, the McGhees lived in Alanya in an Ottoman-era villa they named "Turkish Delight."

McGhee was instrumental in dealings with the Republic of the Congo and the Dominican Republic in the early 1960s. From November 1961 to April 1963, he served as the third ever Under Secretary of State for Political Affairs, during the Kennedy Administration (later to be replaced by W. Averell Harriman). President Kennedy had left this office vacant since January 1961 until McGhee was persuaded to take the position. Following that position, he was again named Ambassador to West Germany from 1963 to 1968.

Retirement
After retiring in 1969, McGhee served on corporate boards of Mobil, Procter and Gamble and Trans World Airlines.

From 1970 to 1974, McGhee was head of the Federal City Council, a group of business, civic, education, and other leaders interested in economic development in Washington, D.C.

McGhee was elected to the American Philosophical Society in 1993.

In retirement McGhee wrote a semi-autobiographical novel, entitled The Dance of the Billions: A Novel About Texas, Houston, and Oil (1990), whose lack of success was attributed by his family to its puritanical tone. His 2001 memoir was entitled I Did It This Way.

In 1989, McGhee donated his villa in Alanya, Turkey to Georgetown University.  Today it is known as the McGhee Center for Eastern Mediterranean Studies, and welcomes students each spring. His estate, Farmer's Delight in Loudoun County, Virginia, is operated by the McGhee Foundation as a museum, research center and meeting facility. It is listed on the National Register of Historic Places.

McGhee died of pneumonia on July 4, 2005, at the age of 93 at Loudoun Hospital Center in Leesburg, Virginia.

References

External links
McGhee biography at the McGhee Foundation
Washington Post Obituary
Interview with Ambassador McGhee
George C. McGhee papers at the Truman Library
George C. McGhee papers at Georgetown University
The George C. McGhee Collection at the University of Oklahoma
Oral History Interview with George C. McGhee, from the Truman Library

1912 births
2005 deaths
Alanya
Alumni of The Queen's College, Oxford
Ambassadors of the United States to Germany
Ambassadors of the United States to Turkey
American Rhodes Scholars
University of Oklahoma alumni
People from Waco, Texas
American petroleum geologists
People from Loudoun County, Virginia
Recipients of the Legion of Merit
Deaths from pneumonia in Virginia
Under Secretaries of State for Political Affairs
United States Assistant Secretaries of State
Directors of Policy Planning
Scientists from Virginia
United States Foreign Service personnel
20th-century American diplomats
Members of the American Philosophical Society